MadHat Press is an American and international book-publishing company located in Cambridge, Massachusetts.

History 

MadHat was founded in 2010 by poets Carol Novack and Marc Vincenz as a platform for new American and international writing. At first, MadHat published a poetry magazine, MadHatters' Review that has later grown into a poetry press.  Writing about MadHatters' Review in PiF Magazine, poet Kristina Marie Darling noted that it "provides a unique forum for writers to experiment with form, narrative, and the relationship between text and other mediums."

After Carol Novack's death that occurred in December 2011, Marc Vincenz has become editor-in-chief.

In an interview with American Book Review, he outlined the magazine's editorial policy:

The press had an imprint, Plume Editions edited by the poet Daniel Lawless. This imprint is now defunct. More recently, the press has also started publishing fiction and criticism.

Notable writers published by the press 

Michael Anania
Robert Archambeau
Tom Bradley
Maxine Chernoff
Sally Connolly
David Dephy
Jeff Friedman
Tess Gallagher 
DeWitt Henry
John Kinsella 
Anatoly Kudryavitsky
Ben Mazer 
Michael Rothenberg
Larissa Shmailo 
John Warner Smith
John Yau

External links
Official website

References

Publishing companies established in 2010
American poetry
Poetry publishers
Literary publishing companies
Book publishing companies based in Massachusetts
Companies based in Cambridge, Massachusetts